Moiseyevo is a rural locality (a selo) in Alexeyevsky Selsoviet, Blagovarsky District, Bashkortostan, Russia. The population was 7 as of 2010. There is 1 street.

Geography 
Moiseyevo is located 29 km southeast of Yazykovo (the district's administrative centre) by road. Novonikolskoye is the nearest rural locality.

References 

Rural localities in Blagovarsky District